Ross is a rural city in McLennan County, Texas, United States. The population was 234 at the 2010 census. It is part of the Waco Metropolitan Statistical Area.

Geography

Ross is located at  (31.726723, –97.106170).

Climate

The climate in this area is characterized by hot, humid summers and generally mild to cool winters.  According to the Köppen Climate Classification system, Ross has a humid subtropical climate, abbreviated "Cfa" on climate maps.

Demographics

As of the census of 2000, there were 228 people, 85 households, and 66 families residing in the city. The population density was 130.8 people per square mile (50.6/km). There were 93 housing units at an average density of 53.3/sq mi (20.6/km). The racial makeup of the city was 96.93% White, 2.19% African American, and 0.88% from two or more races. Hispanic or Latino of any race were 5.26% of the population.

There were 85 households, out of which 34.1% had children under the age of 18 living with them, 67.1% were married couples living together, 8.2% had a female householder with no husband present, and 21.2% were non-families. 20.0% of all households were made up of individuals, and 10.6% had someone living alone who was 65 years of age or older. The average household size was 2.68 and the average family size was 3.09.

In the city, the population was spread out, with 27.6% under the age of 18, 6.6% from 18 to 24, 28.1% from 25 to 44, 22.8% from 45 to 64, and 14.9% who were 65 years of age or older. The median age was 38 years. For every 100 females, there were 103.6 males. For every 100 females age 18 and over, there were 101.2 males.

The median income for a household in the city was $31,250, and the median income for a family was $41,875. Males had a median income of $37,031 versus $21,250 for females. The per capita income for the city was $17,569. About 4.5% of families and 2.8% of the population were below the poverty line, including none of those under the age of eighteen and 10.0% of those 65 or over.

Education
The City of Ross is served by the West Independent School District.

References

Cities in McLennan County, Texas
Cities in Texas